The 1906 Fairmount Wheatshockers football team was an American football team that represented Fairmount College (now known as Wichita State University) as an independent during the 1906 college football season. In its second season under head coach Willis Bates, the team compiled a 7–1–2 record.

Schedule

References

Fairmount
Wichita State Shockers football seasons
Fairmount Wheatshockers football